Eberts may refer to:

People 
 Christopher Eberts, Canadian film and television producer
 David McEwen Eberts (1850–1924), Canadian lawyer and politician
 Jake Eberts (1941–2012), Canadian film producer
 Ken Eberts (born 1943), American painter
 Randall W. Eberts (born 1951), American economist
 Martin Eberts (born 1957), German diplomat
 Mary Eberts (born 1947), Canadian lawyer

Places 
 Eberts Field, former military airfield in Lonoke, Arkansas
 Eberts Villaby, enclave in Amager, Denmark
 John and Emma Lacey Eberts House, a private house in Wyandotte, Michigan and listed on the National Register of Historic Places

See also 
 Ebert, a surname